Nicholas Hasselbach ( – 1769) was a German-American printer, part of a mass migration from Germany who emigrated to Philadelphia in the mid-18th century. He operated a paper mill near Philadelphia, after which he removed to Baltimore, Maryland, where he established that city's first printing press. He was one of the few German speaking printers who that wanted to print religious literature in German. Hasselbach died unexpectedly as a relatively young man, leaving only one known example of his printing, a small book, now owned by a private collector.

Early years
Born in early 18th-century Germany, little is known of Hasselbach's childhood, education, specific religion and other involvements. There is speculation among historians whether Hasselbach is the same "Johannes Nicolaus Wilhelmus Haselbach" whose birth occurred on December 15, 1728, in Raubach, Prussia, and who was christened four days later. Part of a mass migration of Germans and other ethnic groups to Philadelphia, Hasselbach traveled aboard the ship Elliot. According to historian Ralph Strassburger, the largest number of ships arriving in Philadelphia during a single year was twenty-two, in the year 1749, the year Hasselbach is claimed to have arrived from Rotterdam. Professor Daniel Rupp obtained the names of ships and those aboard arriving at Philadelphia, from the files in the Secretary's Office, at Harrisburg, Pennsylvania, and had them published in a single work, entitled A Collection of Thirty Thousand Names, etc. The dates of arrival in the Rupp account differ from those offered by Strassburger's similar work of 1934. Rupp has the arrival date of the Elliot to Philadelphia noted as October 25, 1748. Strassburger, however, who published a work containing signatures reproduced from photographs of ship's passenger lists, has the arrival date of the Elliot noted as August 24, 1749.

Printer
In the papers of Christopher Saur, August 1, 1755, Hasselbach is mentioned as "papermaker in the late Mr. Koch's paper mill on the Wissahicken" (Wissahickon Creek), just outside Philadelphia. In 1757 John Johnson sold his paper mill to Hasselbach. As a journeyman, Hasselbach learned the printing trade from Christopher Saur an accomplished and noted printer in Germantown in 1765. In 1762 Hasselbach arrived in Chestnut Hill, Philadelphia in Philadelphia and established a press shop with Anthony Armbruester, a printer who for many years had printed numerous works in German, including school books and other small works, which he also printed in English. Hasselbach became his silent partner.

Hasselbach moved from Philadelphia and lived in Baltimore for several years where he established the first printing house in that city in 1765. He may have arrived as late as April 1764, but about a year later, on July 6, 1765, Thomas Harrison transferred to him the lot in Baltimore Town next to the Market House, which was located at what is now the northwest corner Baltimore and Gay Streets. According to historians this is the likely location Hasselbach established his printing operation. He soon made other purchases of property in succeeding years. He was well supplied with printing types for printing in both the German and English languages. During this time the newspapers of Philadelphia and Annapolis were the only source of news for the people of Baltimore, while there was no practical printer located in Baltimore proper, until the arrival of Hasselbach.

The only known surviving example of Hasselbach's printing bearing the name of Nicholas is a pamphlet entitled, A Detection of the Conduct and Proceedings of Messrs. Annan and Henderson ... at an Oxford, Pennsylvania Meeting-House, on April 18, 1764, authored by John Redick, a record involving a dispute between various members of a Presbyterian Church at Marshes Creek, near Gettysburg. The small forty-seven-page book, bearing his printer name is the earliest known example of printing produced in Baltimore, and the only known specimen produced by Hasselbach's Baltimore press. In addition, a printed petition survived, which was commissioned by the people of Baltimore and addressed to the Governor and Assembly of Maryland, and circulated throughout the county, urging that the county seat be located in Baltimore on the Patapsco River, rather than in Joppa. There is no actual proof that this petition was from Hasselbach's press, but as he was the only capable printer in Baltimore during this time, historian Lawrence C. Wroth speculated that he was the likely printer.

Final years
Hasselbach went abroad on a business venture, the details of which remain unknown, and was lost at sea in late 1769 or early 1770, leaving behind a wife and three children in Maryland. According to the Baltimore public record, his last business dealing in Baltimore involved a land transaction, conducted on October 26, 1769. Before his death he had plans for printing the Bible in German. After his death Baltimore was without a printer for nearly three years.

His widow, Catherine Hasselbach, in 1773, moved his business and printing wares from Chestnut Hill to Baltimore. after which she sold his printing materials to William Goddard, who in turn sold part of them to Francis Bailey, a printer in Lancaster. Among Hasselbach's personal effects was a collection of twenty-one violins. The total value of his estate was appraised at over £1,675 sterling, which would approximately be the equivalent of $355,000 in the 21st century.

See also
 List of early American publishers and printers
 History of printing
 History of Baltimore
 History of Pennsylvania

Notes

Citations

Bibliography

 

    Book available at Hathi Trust, Digital Library

 

 

 

 

 

 

 

 

18th-century births
1769 deaths
American printers
German emigrants to the Thirteen Colonies
People from Baltimore
People from Philadelphia
People of colonial Maryland
Colonial American printers